Detroit Country Day School (also known as DCD, DCDS, or Country Day) is a private, secular school located in four campuses in Oakland County, in the U.S. state of Michigan, north of Detroit. The administrative offices, facility services, safety and security services, and the upper school (Grades 9-12) are located in a campus in Beverly Hills, whereas the middle school (4-8), and the Lower School (PK-3) are located in two separate campuses in Bloomfield Township, near Bloomfield Hills.

DCDS was founded in Detroit in 1914 by Alden Shaw inspired by the Country Day School movement. The school's motto is Mens Sana in Corpore Sano, a Latin phrase meaning "Sound Mind in a Sound Body". The school colors are blue and gold.

History
Founder, F. Alden Shaw was born to Charles Joseph Shaw and Elizabeth Gahring Shaw in Detroit Lakes, Minnesota on December 20, 1885. Mr. Shaw graduated from the prestigious Boston Latin School in 1905 and Harvard College in 1909. He moved to Paris, France and enrolled in the School for Advanced Studies (L'Ecole des Hautes Etudes), and began raising funds and recruiting students to begin his dream of founding a private school for boys. He soon realized that circumstances in Paris made founding a school an unreasonably daunting task; he decided to return to the United States. On the ship back to America, Mr. Shaw recalls an acquaintance raving about the wondrous opportunities in the blossoming American city of Detroit, Michigan and decided to build a school there.

In the spring of 1914, F. Alden Shaw, under the name Detroit Preparatory School, submitted the following advertisement to the local paper:

Mr. F. Alden Shaw, A.B. (Harvard 1909), announces that September next, he will open a small school for boys. Having had experience as a teacher in Boston, and as a private tutor in the families of Mr. George Lee of Boston, and Mr. Edwin D. Morgan of New York, he comes to Detroit, where there would seem to be a larger field for him. Referring by permission to Reverend Eugene Rodman Shippin, Mr. D. Stearns of Fredrick Stearns and Company and to Mr. Charles Moore, Security Trust Company, Detroit, Michigan. (For appointments address F. A. Shaw, Care Y.M.C.A., Detroit, Michigan.)

According to the school's website, Shaw's legacy is deeply woven into the culture of the school.

Academics 
The Detroit Country Day Upper School offers a strong and varied program that provides numerous opportunities for students to demonstrate their individual strengths and develop their potential.  The rigorous college-preparatory program, which includes Honors and Advanced Placement courses in each discipline in addition to a diverse selection of electives, prepares students for the college and university setting. In addition to a series of honors and Advanced Placement courses, students at Detroit Country Day Upper School may pursue an International Baccalaureate Diploma. Most graduating classes consist of 140 to 180 students, 100% of which are accepted at accredited four-year colleges and universities. From the start of Freshman year, Upper School students participate yearly in standardized testing, beginning with the PLAN in 9th grade to the PSAT in 10th and 11th grade to finally, the ACT and/or SAT during the 11th and 12th grade. The College Counseling Office hosts yearly College Night for every grade to keep students and parents informed about the college application process. Every year, numerous Country Day students achieve National Merit Semi-finalist and Finalist status.

Athletics 
Extracurricular activities are required at DCDS. Under the "points system", these requirements are tracked by the accumulation of blue points (athletics), gold points (clubs) and white points (service). All students must play two competitive sports (one point may come from strength training, the debate team, science fair, robotics, drama, or extracurricular activities deemed appropriate), join one club, and perform ten hours of volunteer work.

Detroit Country Day School participates in Class B Michigan High School Athletic Association athletics. The school has teams in many other sports: notably soccer, swimming, basketball, football, tennis, golf, lacrosse, field hockey, ice hockey, baseball, softball, volleyball, skiing, bowling, and track and field. Intramural teams include ultimate frisbee, sailing, and snowboarding. In total, DCDS offers more than 30 athletic programs. The DCDS mascot is the Yellowjacket. In the school's 107 year history, they have won 115 state championships. Most recently was a football state championship in January 2021 and women's soccer in June of 2021. The men's ice hockey team won back-to-back state championships in 2018 and 2019, but their quest for a third championship was derailed when the 2020 season was canceled due to the COVID-19 pandemic. 

While at Country Day, basketball players Chris Webber and Shane Battier each won the Naismith Prep Player of the Year Award, making Country Day one of only three schools to have multiple Naismith award winners. Webber and Battier are also the only Naismith winners from the state of Michigan.

In March 2004 the Michigan High School Athletic Association recommended that DCDS voluntarily forfeit three state basketball championships won between 1989 and 1991, claiming that former DCDS star Chris Webber had violated his amateur status via his relationship with University of Michigan athletic booster Ed Martin. DCDS declined to follow the MHSAA's suggestion.

Arts 
Detroit Country Day School offers an active fine and performing arts program, celebrated every April through "Celebrate the Arts" weekend at the Upper School campus. Visual arts are part of the student experience at the Lower School, becoming formal academic curriculum at the Middle and Upper Schools. Similarly, general music and keyboard are part of the student experience at the Lower School, but not the formal curriculum. Band, orchestra and choir classes begin at the Middle School in grades 4 & 5, where they are taken as electives during or after school hours. At both the Middle and Upper Schools, multi-level performing classes for band, orchestra and choir meet during school hours. These Upper School classes compete at MSVMA and MSBOA festivals. Bella Voce, a 20-voice mixed ensemble auditioned from the Upper School's Concert Choir, performed in Austria and Germany in 2001, Italy in 2006, and Carnegie Hall in 2008.

The Seligman Family Performing Arts Center, which opened in 2000, houses state-of-the-art digital sound, lighting and projection equipment, allowing for the production of all forms of performing art, including films and lectures. However, due to building height restrictions in the Village of Beverly Hills, the PAC lacks a fly system. The PAC has housed Off Broadway shows such as "The Stoop on Orchard Street" and is the home venue for the Chamber Music Society of Detroit The PAC is frequently used for school assemblies and two major school productions, typically one drama and one musical per year.

Notable alumni

Arts, film, theater, and broadcasting

 Abby Quinn – actress 
 Betsy Thomas – television writer and producer
 Courtney B. Vance – Emmy- and Tony-winning actor
 Robin Williams – Oscar-winning actor and comedian; left prior to graduation
Taylor Hale- Winner of Big Brother 24

Business

 Steve Ballmer – former CEO of Microsoft (2000-2014), and current owner of NBA's Los Angeles Clippers.
 Semon Knudsen – former head of GM's Chevrolet division and president of Ford Motor Company
 Scott Seligman – real estate developer, founder of Sterling Bank and Trust FSB, minority owner of San Francisco Giants

Law

 Neomi Rao – Administrator of the Office of Information and Regulatory Affairs, judge of the United States Court of Appeals for the District of Columbia Circuit
 Robert P. Young Jr. – Michigan Supreme Court Justice

Science, medicine, and engineering
 Paul Kalas – astronomer

Politics and government

 Vishal Amin – Intellectual Property Enforcement Coordinator (IPEC) in the Trump administration
 Jagmeet Singh – leader of the Canadian federal New Democratic Party
 Buzz Thomas – state senator
 Arvind Venkat – physician and member of the Pennsylvania House of Representatives

Sports

Basketball

 Shane Battier – Mr. Michigan Basketball, Duke University player, NCAA national champion, MOP of championship game, 2-time NBA champion with Miami Heat
 Keith Benson – former NBA player for Golden State Warriors
 Ray McCallum Jr. – NBA player for Charlotte Hornets
 JaVale McGee – NBA player and three-time NBA champion, having won consecutive titles with the Golden State Warriors in 2017 and 2018 before winning a third title with the Lakers in 2020; left DCDS prior to graduation
 Aerial Powers – WNBA player for Minnesota Lynx
 Austin Price – player in the Israeli Premier Basketball League
 Edmond Sumner – NBA guard for the Indiana Pacers
 Chris Webber – five-time NBA All-Star, five-time All-NBA Team member, former NBA Rookie of the Year, and former number one overall NBA draftee. As a collegiate athlete, he led the Michigan Wolverines' 1991 incoming freshman class known as the Fab Five. 2021 Naismith Basketball Hall of Fame inductee

Football

 Kenny Demens – linebacker for the University of Michigan and the Arizona Cardinals
 Bennie Fowler – wide receiver for Michigan State University, Super Bowl 50 champion Denver Broncos and the New York Giants
 Jonas Gray – running back for the University of Notre Dame, the New England Patriots and the Jacksonville Jaguars
 Javin Hunter – wide receiver for the University of Notre Dame, Baltimore Ravens and the San Francisco 49ers. NFL player

Hockey

 Patrick Kane – NHL player for 3-time Stanley Cup champion Chicago Blackhawks; left DCDS prior to graduation

Soccer

 Kate Markgraf – professional soccer player, NCAA, Olympic and World Cup champion

Tennis

 Michael Russell – professional tennis player

References

External links 
 

Educational institutions established in 1914
Private high schools in Michigan
Preparatory schools in Michigan
Schools in Oakland County, Michigan
High schools in Oakland County, Michigan
Private middle schools in Michigan
Private elementary schools in Michigan
1914 establishments in Michigan